is a Japanese particle and nuclear physicist, known for his work in supersymmetry, which was first proposed by Miyazawa in 1966 as a possible symmetry between mesons and baryons.

Miyazawa studied physics and received his undergraduate degree in 1950 at the University of Tokyo. He joined the faculty after he received his doctorate in 1953 from the University of Tokyo, and became a full professor of physics in 1968. In 1988 he moved to the Kanagawa University and served there until 1998. Currently he is a professor emeritus of the University of Tokyo. During these periods, he also served visiting professorships at the University of Chicago and the University of Minnesota, and directorship at the Meson Science Laboratory, the University of Tokyo.

From 1953 to 1955 he was a research associate at the Institute for Nuclear Studies, the University of Chicago, where he conducted research on theoretical
nuclear physics under Gregor Wentzel and Enrico Fermi. A supersymmetry relating mesons and baryons was first proposed, in the context of hadronic physics, by Miyazawa in 1966. This supersymmetry did not involve spacetime, that is, it concerned internal symmetry, and was broken badly. Miyazawa's work was largely ignored at the time.

See also
Superalgebra
Superstring theory

Notes

Bibliography

 

Academic staff of Kanagawa University
Mathematical physicists
Japanese string theorists
Academic staff of the University of Tokyo
University of Chicago faculty
University of Minnesota faculty
University of Tokyo alumni
1927 births
Possibly living people